Chihuahua may refer to:

Places
Chihuahua (state), a Mexican state
Chihuahua (dog), a breed of dog named after the state
Chihuahua cheese, a type of cheese originating in the state
Chihuahua City, the capital city of the state
Chihuahua Municipality, the municipality surrounding the city
Chihuahuan Desert, the second largest desert in North America
Chihuahua tradition, a proposed archaeological tradition for the region
Chihuahua, Uruguay, a resort in the Maldonado Department of Uruguay

Songs
"Chihuahua" (song), a song by Louis Oliveira and His Bandodalua Boys, covered and made famous by DJ BoBo
"Chihuahua", a song by The Sugarcubes from the 1992 album Stick Around for Joy
"Chihuahua", a song by Bow Wow Wow from See Jungle! See Jungle! Go Join Your Gang, Yeah. City All Over! Go Ape Crazy
"Chihuahua", a song by Kaotiko (a punk-rock band from Basque country) from the 2003 album Raska y Pierde

Other
ARM Chihuahua, a ship of the Mexican Navy
Chihuahua (chief), a leader of the Chiricahua tribe of Apache Native Americans